Ernesto Azzini (17 October 1885 – 14 July 1923) was an Italian professional road bicycle racer. He was the first Italian cyclist to win a stage in the Tour de France, in 1910.

Major results

1907
GP Peugeot
1908
Milan-Verona
Sanremo-Vintimille-Sanremo
1910
Coppa Savone
Giro d'Italia:
Winner stage 1
Tour de France:
Winner stage 15
1912
Milan
Giro d'Italia:
Winner stage 3

External links 

1885 births
1923 deaths
Italian male cyclists
Italian Tour de France stage winners
Italian Giro d'Italia stage winners
Cyclists from the Province of Mantua